Vaadhdivsachya Haardik Shubhechcha (meaning Happy Birthday) is a 2014 Marathi language comedy film written and directed by Deepak Naidu. The film is presented by Wave Cinemas. It features Ankush Choudhary and Madhu Sharma in lead roles while Kaivalya Latkar, Sanjay Khapre, Pushkar Shrotri, Sushant Shelar, Hemangii Kavi, Jaywant Wadkar, Rajesh Bhosle and Shashikant Kerkar in supporting roles. The film is about a day in Subodh Kudmude's life that happens to be his birthday and on the same day he strikes a fortune. It released on 15 August 2014.

Plot

A Birthday calls for celebration and of course receiving gifts. Most gifts score high on emotions, some gifts are valuable and a few are priceless. However the protagonist, Subodh Kudmude, strikes a fortune on one of his birthdays and becomes a millionaire overnight. The man is very happy and he starts believing that this is an end to his financial struggle and the life ahead is all smooth. However we all are aware that every fortune comes with the clause "Condition Applied". Subodh Kudmude soon realizes that the fortune comes as a package: in addition to five crores, he receives a few freebies that include a troublesome inspector, an annoying NGO agent, a South Indian Don and a dead body that claims to be Mr. Subodh Kudmude.

Suddenly the one that seemed to be his best birthday ever is turning to be a nightmare. However we still wish him "Vaadhdivsachya Haardik Shubhechcha".

Cast

 Ankush Choudhary as Subodh Kudmude
Madhu Sharma as Medha Kudmude
 Kaivalya Latkar as Harishchandra Kudmude 
 Sanjay Khapre as Anthony Aghashe
 Pushkar Shrotri as Samar
 Sushant Shelar as Vinay
 Hemangii Kavi as Vinita
 Jaywant Wadkar as Anna
 Rajesh Bhosle as Ramesh
 Shashikant Kerkar as Suresh

References

External links 
Vaadhdivsachya Haardik Shubhechcha on IMDB
Vaadhdivsachya Haardik Shubhechcha on Facebook

Indian comedy films
2014 films
2010s Marathi-language films
2014 comedy films